John Lethbridge invented the first underwater diving machine.

John Lethbridge may also refer to:

John Giles Lethbridge (1855–1947), Ontario politician
John Sydney Lethbridge (1897–1961), British farmer
Sir John Lethbridge, 1st Baronet (1746–1815), member of parliament for Minehead